Mark Clayton Finlay (born 10 May 1963) is a former New Zealand rugby union player. He was educated at Palmerston North Boys' High School, where he was a member of the 1st XV between 1979 and 1981. A fullback, Finlay represented Manawatu and North Harbour at a provincial level, and was a member of the New Zealand national side, the All Blacks, in 1984. He played two matches for the All Blacks where he scored a total of 18 points (2 tries, 5 conversions), but made no test appearances.

References

1963 births
Living people
Rugby union players from Palmerston North
People educated at Palmerston North Boys' High School
New Zealand rugby union players
New Zealand international rugby union players
Manawatu rugby union players
North Harbour rugby union players
Rugby union fullbacks
New Zealand expatriate rugby union players
Expatriate rugby union players in Italy
New Zealand expatriate sportspeople in Italy
New Zealand expatriate sportspeople in Japan
Expatriate rugby union players in Japan
New Zealand businesspeople